Chausy is a rural locality (a selo) in Pogarsky District, Bryansk Oblast, Russia. The population was 279 as of 2013. There are 8 streets.

Geography 
Chausy is located 24 km south of Pogar (the district's administrative centre) by road. Goritsy is the nearest rural locality.

References 

Rural localities in Pogarsky District
Starodubsky Uyezd